B. J. Britt (born April 20, 1982) is an African-American actor best known for his role as Antoine "Trip" Triplett on Agents of S.H.I.E.L.D., set within the Marvel Cinematic Universe. He is also known for his roles as Paul Patterson Jr. on Being Mary Jane, Darius Beck on Unreal and Will Baker on Pitch.

Early life
Britt was born in Wilson, North Carolina.

Career
Britt made his television debut in 2003 appearing in the recurring role of Devon Fox in One Tree Hill. Subsequently, he appeared in TV shows such as Veronica Mars, CSI: Miami, Cold Case and The Vampire Diaries. He has also acted in movies such as the Victor Salva film Peaceful Warrior and in the Twilight parody film Vampires Suck.

In 2013 he joined the main cast of BET series Being Mary Jane as Paul Patterson Jr., the responsible younger brother of the lead character Pauletta ("Mary Jane Paul") Patterson. The series pilot episode aired on July 2, 2013. The pilot re-aired on November 3, 2013 and the series officially premiered on January 7, 2014. The series ended on April 23, 2019 with a two-hour film finale.

In 2014 he was cast as Agent Antoine Triplett in the ABC series Agents of S.H.I.E.L.D. The character was supposed to die in season 1, but was kept through the first half of season 2 where he was killed off. He briefly returned in season 4 as a virtual artificial intelligence version of the character when the show's lead cast is sent into a "what if" type of world known as the Framework.

In 2016, he joined the main cast of the second season of Unreal, while he also plays the recurring role of Will Baker in Pitch within the same year.

Filmography

References

External links
 

Living people
1982 births
African-American male actors
People from Wilson, North Carolina
American male television actors
Male actors from Los Angeles
21st-century African-American people
20th-century African-American people